Abdallah Imamo Ahmed (born 19 April 1993) is a Comorian international footballer who plays as a defender for UE Sant Julià in Andorra.

Career
Imamo has formerly played in France for Savigny-le-Temple, Longvic, Quétigny, Selongey and Drancy.

International career
On 11 November 2016, Imamo made his senior international debut for Comoros in a 2–2 home friendly draw against Togo, as a 88th-minute substitute for Youssouf M'Changama.

References

1993 births
Living people
Footballers from Seine-et-Marne
Citizens of Comoros through descent
Comorian footballers
Comoros international footballers
French footballers
French sportspeople of Comorian descent
SC Selongey players
JA Drancy players
PFC Cherno More Varna players
UE Sant Julià players
Division d'Honneur players
Championnat National 3 players
Championnat National players
Association football midfielders
Comorian expatriate footballers
Comorian expatriate sportspeople in France
Expatriate footballers in France
Expatriate footballers in Bulgaria